Alexander Johnstone may refer to:

Sandy Johnstone (1916–2000), British air marshal
Alex Johnstone (1961–2016), Scottish Conservative & Unionist politician
Alex Johnstone (footballer) (1896–1979), Scottish footballer (Rangers, Hearts)

See also
Alexander Johnston (disambiguation)
Alexander Johnson (disambiguation)